William Kerr is a Scottish retired amateur footballer who played in the Scottish League for Queen's Park as a wing half. He was capped by Scotland at amateur level.

References 

Scottish footballers
Scottish Football League players
Queen's Park F.C. players
Association football wing halves
Scotland amateur international footballers
Possibly living people
Year of birth missing
Place of birth missing